Edificio Alfredo Mahou (Alfredo Mahou Building), also known as Torre Mahou (Mahou Tower) is a skyscraper in the AZCA Complex, Madrid, Spain. It is the 17th tallest building in Madrid, at 85 metres. It has 29 floors and its facade is crystal blue and purple.

Was completed in 1990, the building houses offices and various companies.

Skyscraper office buildings in Madrid
Office buildings completed in 1990
Buildings and structures in Cuatro Caminos neighborhood, Madrid